"Nearer, My God, to Thee" is a 19th-century Christian hymn by Sarah Flower Adams.

Nearer My God to Thee may also refer to:
 Nearer My God to Thee (film), a 1917 British silent film
 Nearer My God to Thee (Homicide: Life on the Street), an episode of Homicide: Life on the Street
 Nearer My God to Thee (album), a 1957 album by The Louvin Brothers
 Nearer My God to Thee, a 1995 album by Pat Boone